The National Space Facilities Control and Test Center (Ukrainian: Національний центр управління та випробувань космічних засобів) is a Ukrainian state institution which is subordinated to the State Space Agency of Ukraine and performs flight control of spacecraft, space exploration using its own technical means, control of outer space and geophysical monitoring, and testing of space technologies. After annexation of Crimea the National Space Facilities Control and Test Center moved from Evpatoriia to Kyiv.

Responsibilities 
The mission of the National Space Facilities Control and Test Center consists of:

 receiving, processing and analysis of scientific and special information from spacecraft and others in order to instantly prevent the emergence of  dangers that threaten the national security and prompt information support of senior government officials;
 control of national and foreign special, scientific and dual-purpose spacecraft;
 control and analysis of the space situation to ensure the launch of spacecraft by national launch vehicles and assess the degree of safety of their flight and operation in orbit, analysis of the capabilities of foreign orbital groups to monitor the territory of Ukraine;
 control of the navigation field integrity of Global Navigation Satellite Systems (GNSS), monitoring of national and foreign satellite and ground functional additions of GNSS, the provision of services for GNSS;
 control over compliance with international treaties and agreements about restrictions and prohibition of nuclear weapons tests on foreign nuclear test sites and nuclear explosions for peaceful purposes, as well as control over the radiation at the points of deployment;
 taking a part in testing and operation of spacecraft, operation of ground-based space infrastructure and ancillary equipment;
 flight control of national and foreign spacecraft, as well as spacecraft within the framework of international projects and programs;
 performing the functions of the operator of national space observation systems of the Earth, receiving, processing, analyzing, storing special information obtained from national and foreign spacecraft and systems for various purposes, and providing results to users;
 performing the functions of the operator of national space observation systems of the Earth, receiving, processing, analyzing, storing special information which was obtained from national and foreign spacecraft and systems for various purposes, and providing results to users;
 monitoring of space environment by its own and attracted radio engineering, optical and quantum-optical means;
 performing the functions of the coordinate-time and navigation support system operator, control of the integrity of the satellite radio navigation field by own and involved technical means, monitoring of global navigation satellite systems, provision of satellite navigation information services to state institutions;
 control over the seismic situation and other geophysical phenomena on the territory of Ukraine and the globe by technical means;
 participation in the elimination of intercontinental ballistic missile PC-22 and solid rocket fuel, in accordance with international treaties and agreements;
 other activities in the field of information technology and computer systems, in particular, posting information on web sites and related activities, computer programming, consultancy on informatization, computer equipment management activities.

Main projects 
Earth Remote Sensing is the data acquisition of the Earth from space, using the properties of electromagnetic waves emitted, reflected, absorbed or scattered by sounding objects. The data is used for:

 the early identification of thermal anomalies (fires);
 forecasting the level of  flammability in the territory of Ukraine;
 monitoring the temperature of the underlying surface;
 the conditions of the flood situation in the territory of Ukraine;
 monitoring of the snow conditions and snowmelt;
 forecasting the probability of snow melting in Ukraine;
 monitoring of the extent of snow cover in the territory of Ukraine;
 monitoring of the ice cover of the Sea of Azov and the Kerch Strait.
Creation of the National Satellite Communication System in order to improve the level of state security in the information sphere, in particular:

 improving security and reliability of functioning of satellite communication systems for state users;
 provision of broadcast satellite television and radio in the territory of Ukraine and abroad.
Space Environment Control and Analysis System (Ukrainian: СКАКО) —  the system which was created for data collecting, processing and analisys about the space situation, data preparation and issuance about the space situation and thends of its development to consumers. Its main responsibilities are:

 collecting information about space objects and its cataloguing;
 formation of expired objects' catalogs;
 Ballistic Information Support for space observation;
 formation of messages about space situation and bringing them to the SKAKO information consumers;
In addition, optical, radio engineering  and software-hardware complex are functional within the framework of SKAKO.

National Seismic Monitoring System (Ukrainian: НССС). The operation of the system is aimed at solving such tasks: 

 making earthquake forecasts based on seismic observations and analysis of their results; 
 Information support of works on seismic zoning of the territory of Ukraine, assessment of potential seismic hazard, seismic construction, as well as basic and applied research aimed at solving earthquake forecasting problems; 
 development of seismic zoning maps of the territory of Ukraine, regulations on protection of the population, objects and territories of Ukraine from the impact of earthquakes, functioning and development of the system;
 operational support of central and local executive bodies, the Council of Ministers of the Autonomous Republic of Crimea, whose territories are located in earthquake-prone areas;
 information on earthquakes and their possible consequences;
 operative determination of the location, time and parameters of earthquakes, other geophysical phenomena and nuclear explosions at foreign testing sites;
 organization of the central bank of geophysical data of the System and provision of interregional and international exchange of geophysical information.

References 

Space research
Ukrainian space institutions